Vrhovci may refer to:

 Vrhovci, Slovenia, a village near Črnomelj
 Vrhovci, Ljubljana, a former village in Ljubljana, Slovenia
 Vrhovci, Croatia, a village near Čabar